Gubb may refer to:

Gubb (application), a Web-based list application that requires no downloaded software
Thomas Gubb (1908–1978), a South African businessman and an early twentieth century rugby union footballer
Philo Gubb, a character created by prolific pulp fiction writer Ellis Parker Butler
Charlie Gubb (born 1990), a New Zealand rugby league footballer